The 2009 Campeonato Argentino de Rugby  was won by the selection of Cordoba that beat in the final the selection of Tucumàn

That year in Argentine rugby 
 Argentina and England played two test in June. English won at Manchester (37-15), but "Pumas" won (24-22) in Salta.

 The "A" national team, played a lot of matches. First beat two time Namibia in tour, then won as usual the Southamerican Championship and participated also to the Churchill Cup, were finished at third place. 
 In November the "A" team, won 2 volte with Uruguay at home, then started for a Tour in Europe were played against Georgia (lost 22-24), Portugal (won 24-13) and Ireland "A" (lost 31-0)
 In November the  "Pumas", visited Great Britain losing against England (6-19), Wales (16-33) and winning with Scotland (9-6)

"Campeonato"

Pool 1

Pool 2

Semifinals

Final

Play Out

 Champions: Córdoba
 Relegated : San Juan

"Ascenso"

Pool "North 1"

Pool North 2

Pool South 1

Pool South 2

Semifinals

Final

 promoted : Noreste (won on aggregate 48-45)

Notes

External links 
  Campeonato Argentino on rugbyfun.com.ar
  Francesco Volpe, Paolo Pacitti (Author), Rugby 2010, GTE Gruppo Editorale (2009)

Campeonato Argentino de Rugby
Argentina
Rugby